Lowell Yerex (24 July 1895 – 1968) was born in New Zealand, and attended Valparaiso University in Valparaiso, Indiana United States.

He graduated from Valparaiso University in 1916. He volunteered for the British Royal Flying Corps in 1917, was shot down over France and spent four months in a German prisoner-of-war camp.

In 1931, he founded Transportes Aéreos Centro Americanos (TACA), but was forced out at the end of 1945. He went on to found British West Indian Airways in Trinidad and Tobago in 1940, at the invitation of Lady Young, wife of Trinidad and Tobago's new governor Sir Hubert Winthrop Young.

In 1941, he founded Aerovias Brasil in Rio de Janeiro.  After several mergers and acquisitions, the successor companies were eventually acquired by VARIG in 1961.

He was born in Wellington, New Zealand and died in Buenos Aires, Argentina.

References 
Yerex of TACA: A Kiwi Conquistador (1985, Ampersand, New Zealand) by David Yerex (nephew)  
Aviator of Fortune: Lowell Yerex and the Anglo-American Commercial Rivalry 1931-1946 by Eric Benson (2006, Texas A&M University Press)

External links
Yerex ousted from TACA (Time, 1945)

1895 births
1968 deaths
Businesspeople in aviation
Valparaiso University alumni
Royal Flying Corps officers
World War I prisoners of war held by Germany
British Army personnel of World War I
20th-century American businesspeople
20th-century New Zealand businesspeople
New Zealand prisoners of war in World War I
New Zealand emigrants to the United States